Moulin Noir is a Swedish synthpop project run by Anders Wikholm. Previously known as Moulin Rogue, Anders changed the name of the band to Moulin Noir having passed posters in Paris advertising the cabaret Moulin Rouge, and deciding that it wasn't very 'cool', so changed to Noir.

All of Moulin Noir's lyrics are in English.

Currently signed to the US Synthpop Record Label, A Different Drum, Moulin Noir has produced a number of albums and singles, his most famous within the underground Synthpop scene probably being "Spellbound", or "Maria Calling".

Production
Moulin Noir likes to use old, retro synthesizers to create his unique New Romantic sound, using mostly Hardware, Anders dislikes using computers for his music. Having written his own guide on his website on New Romantic, Anders states, "...you will need at least one analogue synth. Analogue simulating gear will work, but not in all situations. You'll probably need a sampler too. An old 12 bit model will do. ..."

Compiling a rather large list on his website, Anders has written his thoughts on each one, as well as providing a few samples for your own Ensoniq instrument.

Anders usually performs live with the group Run Level Zero, and has had his track Spellbound remixed by them.

Style
Moulin Noir has remained pretty true to his style since the very first album, What's Up Now? to his final, more polished sounding album Boy In Darkness. Lyrically, the themes of his songs can vary completely, from Over The Wall (a track on the Descending album), a song about himself taking part on a top secret mission, to Media Boy (a track on the Boy In Darkness album), a song about a young male who becomes extremely famous, then the tale of how his career comes crumbling down.

Moulin Noir is one artist who is not afraid to wail, and is well known at live shows to wear extravagant gothic clothing and makeup. He is not camera shy, but considers the look as well as the sound to be an important factor in creating New Romantic music.

Discography

Albums
What's Up Now? (1993) TERS Records (TERS T-2 CD01)
Descending (2000) Burning Car (CAR-2)
The White Room (2001) A Different Drum (ADDCD1098) Remixes and rare tracks
Boy In Darkness (2004) A Different Drum (ADDCD1119)

EPs
I Can't Sleep (2000) Burning Car (CAR-1) I Can't Sleep / I Can't Sleep (Frantically) / Sleepless On The Floorshow / I C-Art, Can't Sleep / Utopia - Here We Come! / This Time
Maria Calling (2001) Burning Car (CAR-3) Maria Calling (Radio Edit) / Automation / An Ocean With Seagulls / Maria Calling (Remastered Original / Maria Calling (C-Art Edit) / Maria Calling (Video)
A New Frontier (2004) A Different Drum (ADDCD1113) A New Frontier (Single Edit) / A New Frontier (Lo-Fi Disco Mix) / Easier Said Than Done / All You Ever Wanted / A New Frontier (Extended Mix)

Similar musical style to 'Moulin Noir' 
 Orchestral Manoeuvres in the Dark
 Simple Minds
 Depeche Mode

External links
 Moulin Noir's Official Website.
 Moulin Noir at Discogs.
 Moulin Noir at mySpace.
 Spot Moulin's role in animated media

Swedish synthpop groups
Swedish new wave musical groups